Proxies is a 1921 American silent drama film feature produced by Cosmopolitan Productions and distributed by Paramount Pictures. It was directed by George D. Baker and starred Norman Kerry.

Plot
As described in a film publication summary, Carlotta Darley (Dean) is engaged to Homer Carleton (Crosby), but regrets that Homer is not as tall and handsome as the butler Peter (Kerry). Her father Christopher Darley (Tooker) was aware that Peter was a former crook but believes that he has reformed. Clare Conway (Keefe), the household maid, is in love with Peter and jealous of Carlotta's admiration of him. A reception is in progress when John Stover (Everton) arrives with a paper that will bring about the Darleys' financial ruin. Peter arranges to have John brought into the reception room, then holds up the guests to secure the paper and save his employer. Peter and Clare then escape together.

Cast
Norman Kerry as Peter Mendoza
Zena Keefe as Clare Conway
Raye Dean as Carlotta Darley
Jack Crosby as Homer Carleton
Paul Everton as John Stover
William H. Tooker as Christopher Darley
Mrs. Schaffer as Mrs. Darley
Robert Broderick as Detective Linton

Preservation status
A copy of Proxies is preserved at the Library of Congress.

References

External links

Film still at silenthollywood.com

1921 films
Films directed by George D. Baker
Films based on short fiction
Paramount Pictures films
1921 crime drama films
American crime drama films
American black-and-white films
American silent feature films
1921 drama films
1920s American films
Silent American drama films
1920s English-language films